Day and Night and its variants may refer to:

Books
Day and Night, poems 1924-1934 by New Zealand poet Ursula Bethell
Day and Night, children's book by Teddy Newton based on Pixar's Day & Night
Day and Night, children's book by Anita Ganeri
Day and Night, children's book by Jen Green

Film and TV
 Day and Night (1997 film) (Le jour et la nuit), a French film directed by Bernard-Henri Lévy
 Day and Night (2004 Chinese film) (日日夜夜), directed by Wang Chao
 Day and Night (2004 Swedish film) (Dag och natt), directed by Simon Staho
 Day & Night (2010 film), a short film by Pixar
 Day and Night (TV series), 2017 Chinese TV series directed by Wang Wei
 Awaken (TV series), literally Day and Night, a South Korean thriller

Music
"Day and Night", composition for contralto, piano and cello by Danish composer Per Nørgård

Albums
 Day & Night (album), a Chinese pop album by Janice Vidal, 2005
 Day & Night (EP), mini-album by South Korean group Kara, 2014
 Day and Night, a 1985 EP by Balaam and the Angel
 The Day and the Night, 1997 album by Roscoe Mitchell

Songs
 "Day & Night" (Billie Piper song), 2000
 "Day & Night", by Basshunter from Bass Generation, 2009
 "Day and Night" (Isyss song), 2002
 "Day and Night", by The Drag Set, 1967
 "Day and Night", by The Wackers, 1973
 "Day and Night", by Loona from Hash, 2020
 "Day 'n' Nite", song by Kid Cudi, 2008

Other

 Day and Night, a pair of nude sculptures by Jacob Epstein
 Day and Night (cellular automaton)
 Day and Night (painting), by Rufino Tamayo

See also
 Day for night (disambiguation)
 Le jour et la nuit (disambiguation), the French equivalent
 Night and Day (disambiguation)
 Tag und Nacht (disambiguation), the German equivalent